Into the Light is the third solo album by David Coverdale. It was released in September 2000. In between 1978 and 1997, Coverdale and his band Whitesnake produced nine studio albums. After a three-year break, he returned with what was officially his first solo album since 1978's Northwinds. His 1997 album Restless Heart was recorded as a solo project, but for contractual reasons his label forced him to release it under the Whitesnake moniker. The new album "Into the Light" released in 2000 reached #75 on the UK album chart.

Background
In an interview with Classic Rock magazine in 2000, Coverdale stated: "The whole premise of my new record, Into The Light, is about coming out of what I felt was a dark period... I didn't really know who I was, using the illusion of David Coverdale I've created, or that other people have. I got tired of trying to live up to that, which is not necessarily who I am."

"Too Many Tears" was a new arrangement of the same song originally appearing on Coverdale's previous studio album, Whitesnake's Restless Heart. "Love Is Blind" was released as a single with an accompanying music video, but did not chart. "Slave" reached No. 33 on the US Billboard Mainstream Rock Tracks chart.

Three additional songs were recorded for this album that did not make the final CD. Coverdale released these tracks on his official Whitesnake.com website. A number of other titles, written by Coverdale, have yet to be released. Some unreleased songs from this period have found their way onto subsequent releases such as: "Wherever You May Go (Acoustic Demo)" and "All The Time In The World" on the 2018 box set, Unzipped, as well as an early demo version of "River Song". "Flesh And Blood" and "Heart Of Stone" appeared on Whitesnake's 2019 studio album, Flesh & Blood. The newly released Love Songs collection in 2020 also feature songs from this period, including the first publicly available versions of "Let's Talk It Over" and "Yours For The Asking".

So far, songs that have been heard and known to exist that did not make the final cut of the album are: “With All Of My Heart”, “As Long As I Have You”, “Oh No, Not The Blues Again!”, “Heart Of Stone”, “Flesh And Blood”, “Let’s Talk It Over”, “Yours For The Asking” and “All The Time In The World”.

Coverdale has stated in numerous interviews that Into The Light is likely to receive a deluxe box set rerelease along with other recent Whitesnake albums. While no track list has been released, this may include more unreleased tracks and perhaps the original album versions of tracks that appeared later, such as “Heart Of Stone” and “Flesh And Blood”, may be heard for the first time.

Reception

Into the Light received mixed to positive reviews from music critics. Siân Llewellyn of Classic Rock awarded the album four stars out five. She gave praise to Coverdale's vocal performance, noting how "the songs he's chosen showcase his vocals subtly rather than bludgeoning you over the head with them". Llewellyn also singled out "Love is Blind" as "one of the best things [Coverdale's] ever come up with". Liam Sheils, writing for Kerrang!, described Into the Light as an improvement over Whitesnake's previous album Restless Heart. While disappointed by the abundance of ballads, Sheils was pleased with Coverdale's return to his bluesier roots. This was echoed by the staff of Rock Hard, who described the album as a more relaxed effort than Restless Heart, while still acting as a successful cross section of previous Whitesnake material. Metal Hammers Matthias Mineur singled out "Slave" as one of Coverdale's best songs in years. Overall, he described  Into the Light as "great" and "powerful".

AllMusic's Alex Henderson gave cudos to Coverdale for not trying to chase then-current musical trends and instead sticking "with the type of commercial hard rock, arena rock, and power ballads that he is best known for". Ultimately, Henderson described Into the Light as "a decent solo effort that should please those who admire [Coverdale's] '70s and '80s output". Soundis Antti Mattila commented positively on Coverdale's vocal performance and the album's bluesier style. However, he felt that the songwriting was not quite up to par with Coverdale's earlier work with Whitesnake. Mattila was also unimpressed by the lyrics, which he described as clichéd, a sentiment echoed by Q magazine's Peter Kane.

Neil Jeffries, writing for Classic Rock, ranked Into the Light eighth in Coverdale's overall studio discography. He gave praise to Coverdale's vocals and described the record as a "lost gem", singling out "River Song" as a particular highlight.

Track listing

Personnel
Credits are adapted from the album's liner notes.

Charts

References

2000 albums
David Coverdale albums
EMI Records albums
Hard rock albums by British artists
Pop rock albums by British artists
Blues rock albums by British artists